The Singareni Collieries Employees Union is a trade union in the Singareni coal fields in Andhra Pradesh, India. SCEU is affiliated to the Centre of Indian Trade Unions.

Formation
SCEU was formed out of a split in the All India Trade Union Congress-affiliated Singareni Collieries Workers Union in 1978. SCEU was founded at a meeting in Kothagudem in July 1978. It was registered on 2 January 1979.

Membership
As of 1984, SCEU had 3,513 members. In the 1980s SCEU was characterized for being well organised and with a high-profile leadership, even though the union is one of the smaller unions in the area.

Officers
As of 2005, Bojja Bixamaiah was the president of SCEU. K. George had previously served as SCEU general secretary.

References

Trade unions in India
Trade unions in Telangana
Trade unions of the Singareni coal fields
Mining trade unions
Trade unions established in 1978
1978 establishments in Andhra Pradesh